Attalea butyracea is a species of palm tree native from Mexico to northern South America.

References

Trees of Mexico
Trees of Peru
butyracea